Aamer Ahmed Gangat (born 28 October 1976 in Karachi) is a Pakistani former first-class cricketer active 1996–1997 who played for Karachi Whites. Aamer Gangat was a right-handed batsman and a right-arm off break bowler.

References

1976 births
Pakistani cricketers
Karachi Whites cricketers
Living people